Rear Admiral Ran Vijay Singh Rathore (December 1932 – 3 December 1971) served the Indian Navy from 1953 to 1971. He attended Dartmouth College. He was the son of Lieutenant General Nathu Singh Rathore. He died in the submarine named INS Karanj (S21). He was the captain of the mission.

References

1932 births
Indian Navy admirals
Dartmouth College alumni
Living people